Unity Baptist Church is a historic African American Baptist church at Sumter and Hart Streets in Kershaw, Lancaster County, South Carolina. It was built in 1910, and is a Late Gothic Revival style frame church building.  Also on the property are the contributing church's parsonage and its privy.

It was added to the National Register of Historic Places in 1990.

References

African-American history of South Carolina
Baptist churches in South Carolina
Churches on the National Register of Historic Places in South Carolina
Carpenter Gothic church buildings in South Carolina
Churches completed in 1910
Churches in Lancaster County, South Carolina
National Register of Historic Places in Lancaster County, South Carolina